Keith Gregg Rutter (10 September 1931 – June 2021) was an English professional footballer who made 402 appearances in the Football League playing as a centre half for Queens Park Rangers and Colchester United.

Rutter was born in Leeds on 10 September 1931. He was a reliable defender, who made his QPR debut in August 1954 against Southend United and went on to play 339 league games, scoring 1 goal. He was ever present for three seasons.

He went on to play non-league football with Romford and Ashford Town (where he was a league ever-present in the 1965–1966 season), before ending his career as player-manager of Hastings United.

He died in June 2021, at the age of 89.

References

1931 births
2021 deaths
Footballers from Leeds
English footballers
Association football defenders
Queens Park Rangers F.C. players
Colchester United F.C. players
Romford F.C. players
Ashford United F.C. players
Hastings United F.C. (1948) players